Executive Power is Vince Flynn's fifth novel, and the fourth to feature Mitch Rapp, an American agent that works for the CIA as an operative for a covert counter terrorism unit called the "Orion Team".

Plot summary
CIA field agent Mitch Rapp's cover has been blown following his last assignment, preventing Saddam Hussein from obtaining nuclear weapons. Rapp receives public acknowledgment by the president in response to the latest Congressional leak to the media. Though the praise is of the highest quality, the President might as well have placed a bulls-eye on Rapp's chest and that of his loved ones by singling him out as the most important person in the fight against terrorism. The spotlight makes the former covert operator an ideal international target for eradication by terrorists as the symbol he has become.

Rapp moves from CIA operative duties to that of a counter-terrorism bureaucrat. As special advisor on counter-terrorism to CIA director Dr. Irene Kennedy, Rapp uncomfortably sits in an office. However, everything changes when radical Islamic terrorists ambush Navy SEALs on a top-secret rescue mission in the Philippines. The leak had to be in either the State Department or the Philippine diplomatic corps, but nobody knows for sure. However, worse yet is that someone is trying to cause a Jihad on a scale never before seen and that unknown invisible individual is close to achieving the goal with only a too visible Rapp in the way.

Rapp leads a team to avenge that loss by defeating the Philippine terrorist network that killed two SEAL team members and rescuing the American hostages. In order to successfully accomplish this mission he must keep its existence from the turncoats who betrayed those who went before him. The coincidental plot-line has forces plotting to upset the tenuous balance in the Middle East's geopolitical situation. A flamboyant Saudi Prince, who is banished from the Kingdom, elicits the help of a Palestinian assassin to murder the leaders of terrorist cells as well as Saudi and Palestinian Ambassadors in the hopes of dissolving US support for Israel and the eventual establishment of an official Palestinian state.

References

2003 American novels
American thriller novels
Novels by Vince Flynn
Atria Publishing Group books